The Canton of Sainte-Anne is a former canton in the Arrondissement of Le Marin on Martinique. It had 4,554 inhabitants (2012). It was disbanded in 2015. The canton comprised the commune of Sainte-Anne.

References

Cantons of Martinique